Capital punishment is abolished in the District of Columbia. However, a number of executions were carried out under the District's jurisdiction before abolition. These executions should be distinguished from cases such as the 1942 execution of the six Nazi saboteurs which took place in the District, but under the jurisdiction of the Federal Government.

History
Before 1973, the District of Columbia was exclusively governed by the United States Congress, which included establishing all local laws. Until 1962, the District of Columbia was the last jurisdiction in the United States with mandatory death sentences for first-degree murder (the last state with mandatory death sentences for first degree murder was Vermont). Mandatory death sentences were abolished by the HR5143 (PL87-423), signed into law by President John F. Kennedy on March 22, 1962. Rape was also a capital offense.

The D.C. capital punishment law was nullified by the Supreme Court decision in Furman v. Georgia in 1972 and formally repealed by the D.C. Council in 1981. In the 1992 Congress-ordered referendum, District residents voted against reinstating the death penalty (the District is a liberal stronghold which usually give at least 85% of its votes to the Democratic candidate in presidential elections). In 1997, Mayor Marion Barry proposed a bill allowing capital punishment for the murder of public safety employees, which was rejected by the Council's Judiciary Committee.

The first recorded execution in District of Columbia, was the hanging of James McGirk in 1802. Hanging was the method of execution used in the District until 1928, when it was replaced by the electric chair. The last execution under the authority of the District took place in 1957, when Robert Carter was executed.

The President of the United States has sole pardoning power in the District.

See also
 List of people executed by the District of Columbia
 Crime in Washington, D.C.
 Government of the District of Columbia

References 

District
 
History of the District of Columbia